Pangavini Island (or simply Pangavini) is an uninhabited Tanzanian island in the Zanzibar Channel, about 1.5 km off the mainland, north of the country's capital city, Dar es Salaam and is one of the nine islands of the Dar es Salaam Marine Reserve System (DMRS).
The island is small, only about 250 m long; it has a rocky coastline without beaches.

Pangavini Island is an important breeding, resting and feeding site to a variety of rats, birds and reptiles (snakes and lizards).
There is also an assortment of insects including butterflies.

See also
Tanzania Marine Parks and Reserves Unit
List of protected areas of Tanzania

External links

Geography of Dar es Salaam
Uninhabited islands of Tanzania